Aisa Aragonese is a dialect of Aragonese language spoken in Aísa Valley. It is very similar to Aragüés Aragonese and Jaca Aragonese.

Article 
The article is like in General Aragonese :o, a, os, as.
As in Somontano de Ayerbe, it is contracted with preposition: d'o, d'a, n'o, n'a, t'o, t'a.

See also 
Aragonese dialects

Aragonese dialects